Leonarda Sgroot (born  in Uden) is a Dutch female volleyball player. She was part of the Netherlands women's national volleyball team.

She participated in the 2009 FIVB Volleyball World Grand Prix.
On club level she started playing for Saturnus HC and played for AMVJ in 2009.

References

External links
 Profile at FIVB.org

1986 births
Living people
Dutch women's volleyball players
People from Uden
Sportspeople from North Brabant